Carmel Garden Matriculation Higher Secondary School is a school in Coimbatore, Tamil Nadu, India. It was the first matriculation school for boys started in Coimbatore, on 1 June 1964 by the Coimbatore Catholic Diocese Society under the auspices of the Roman Catholic Mission. Founded by Reverend Francis M. Savarimuthu, the then Bishop of Coimbatore, the school is situated in a campus of seven acres near Sungam and Red Fields.

In 1970 the first batch of students appeared for the matriculation examination conducted by the University of Madras. A student came first in science at state level.

Former principals
 Rev. Fr. M.M. Chinnayan - first correspondent (1964–1966)
 Rev. Fr. Patrick D'Rozario - first principal (1964–1965)
 Rev. Fr. M. Anthony Lawrence - principal and correspondent (1966–1972)
 Rev. Fr. A. Maria Mudiappan - principal and correspondent (1972–1986)
 Rev. Fr. G. Joseph Felix - vice principal and warden (1980–86), principal and correspondent (1986–90)
 Rev. Fr. I. Maria Antony Raj - principal and correspondent (1990–2003)
 Rev. Fr. A.L. Sundar Raj - principal and correspondent (2003–2006)
 Rev. Fr. Thaddeus Paul Raj - principal and correspondent (2006–2011).

Activities
 Scout
 NCC
 Clubs
 Sports
 Road safety patrol

Sports
The school has a large playing ground, comprising one football ground, one hockey ground, two basketball courts, two volleyball courts, one high jump pit, one long jump pit and space for the other track events as well. 

Achievements in sports and games:
 St. Lawrence School, Lovedale, Ooty conducted the South State Basketball Tournament in 1991, and Carmel Garden school team won third place.
 In 1990-91, Bharathiar Day Inter-District Basketball Tournament, Carmel Garden school team won third place.
 In the Republic Day tournaments in 1996-97, a student won the singles title in state level table tennis tournaments and the same student was runner up in the same in 1997-98. He also won the singles winner title in the Bharathiar Day Table-Tennis State Level Tournaments in 1998-99.
 In 1984 a student set a district junior 100 metre sprint record of 11.8 seconds.
 Master Aniruth of 10th Std was selected for the Tamil Nadu youth basketball team and played for the national tournament in 2003-04.
 Master Sabari Srinivasan of 8th std was selected for the Tamil Nadu sub-junior basketball team and played for the national tournament in 2003-04.
 Master Aniruth of 10th Std & Master Sabari Srinivasan of 8th Std was selected by the Tamil Nadu State Sports Development Authority for State Basketball Coaching Camp (World Wide Sports Scheme) in 2003-04.
 In 2003-04, Salem District Chess Association conducted a state level mini-chess tournament, a student was runner-up., and  also participated in the international chess tournament and played against players from Sri Lanka, South Africa and Usbekisthan, in Calicut in July 2004.

Labs
 Physics lab
 Chemistry lab
 Biology lab situated in the Higher Secondary block. The laboratory is equipped with 25 dissection microscopes and 25 compound microscopes. A very good number of micro-slides are there for the observation. There are more than 100 specimen jars containing plants and animals and their organs. A human skeleton compiled of real bones is kept in the laboratory.
 Computer lab 
 Lab 1 - Situated in the Higher Secondary block, measuring 800 sq ft is equipped with 30 terminals. The terminals are installed with latest version of various software, enabling them to develop their computing skills during their practice sessions. 
 Lab 2 - Located in the High School block. 30 terminals with multimedia facilities are present in this lab, where-in the students are permitted to surf the internet to improve their knowledge.
 Lab3 - Present in the Primary section Block. The younglings learn here through the multimedia rhymes with the help of 6 terminals present in this lab.

Library
The library houses books of general interest and reference materials including pamphlets, journals, maps, charts, models, back volumes and CD ROMs. The collection of library books is 7300 titles. The library has also subscribed to various periodicals for the betterment of students and teachers as well.

References

External links
 Official website

Catholic secondary schools in India
Boys' schools in India
Christian schools in Tamil Nadu
High schools and secondary schools in Tamil Nadu
Schools in Coimbatore
Educational institutions established in 1964
1964 establishments in Madras State